Mr. Nutz: Hoppin' Mad is a side-scrolling platform game developed by German teams Kaiko and Neon Studios and published by Ocean Software for the Amiga in October of 1994. The player controls Mr. Nutz, an anthropomorphic red squirrel wearing shoes, gloves and a cap, who must stop chickens from outer space that are trying to take over the world.

Jumping is the main technique used to navigate platforms and defeat or avoid enemies. There is an overworld map in overhead view in which a small amount of gameplay takes place, and from which the player selects which levels to play.

Development

The game started out as Timet: the Flying Squirrel by a group of people in Kaiko who later formed the Neon Studios company. When the publishing rights of the game were granted to Ocean, the main character of Timet, a slimmer flying squirrel, was replaced with the already existing character of Mr. Nutz, a fluffier red squirrel portrayed by Ocean in the iconic mascot era of the Nineties. The game was then renamed as Mr. Nutz: Hoppin' Mad, though all of the level and enemy designs remained as they were before. Hoppin' Mad was developed by Neon Studios and published in Europe by Ocean for the Amiga 500 and Amiga 600 in 1994.

Ocean had previously released a game on multiple consoles under the shorter name of Mr. Nutz, featuring the same titular character but with different, slower and more linear gameplay, unrelated levels and enemies, another story, and the absence of an overworld map to select the levels, with only a linear mini-map to follow the course of action instead. Hoppin' Mad uses a slightly revised spriteset of Mr. Nutz from that game in order to represent him.

Mega Drive version
Sometime after its original Amiga releases, the Neon Studios game was eventually stated to be ported to the Mega Drive to be released in Europe in 1995 as Mr. Nutz 2, acting as the sequel of the console Mr. Nutz game which had already been released in this particular system. However, despite being fully completed by the developer and even tested by European press reviewers, the Mega Drive port of Mr. Nutz: Hoppin' Mad was never published because of Ocean's diminishing support of the platform. A ROM image compiled from the Mega Drive source code was leaked online in 2012 by the ASSEMblergames.com community.

Reception

References

1994 video games
Ocean Software games
Amiga games
Amiga-only games
Cancelled Sega Genesis games
Side-scrolling platform games
Video games developed in Germany
Single-player video games
Europe-exclusive video games
Video game sequels